Morro de São Paulo (translation: St. Paul's Hill) is one of 5 villages of the island of Tinharé in the municipality of Cairu, located in the state of Bahia, Brazil. The main beaches of the Morro de São Paulo are located on east side of the island . They are: Primeira Praia, Segunda Praia, Terceira Praia, Quarta Praia and Quinta Praia (also known as Praia do Encanto). The settlement was home to a large Tumpinamba population prior to the arrival of the Portuguese. A Portuguese colony was established as early as 1535. The settlement is a site of large-scale tourism, and has three registered historic sites.

History 

Martim Afonso de Sousa, landed in 1531 and baptized this island "Tynharéa" and the Bahian accent soon transformed that name to "Tinharé". In 1535 the village of Morro de São Paulo was founded in the extreme north of the island by Francisco Romero and the local population. Morro de Sao Paulo was the site of patrols and attacks by German submarines between 1942 and 1945 as part of German naval attacks across the coast of Bahia and Sergipe during World War II. The German government initially targeted merchant ships off Bahia and Sergipe, but civilian casualties were numerous. The German submarine U-507 attacked the Itagiba off the Morro de São Paulo Lighthouse, killing the majority of the 179 passengers.  The citizen of Bahia experienced scarcity, speculation, and famine due to the threat of German attack from 1942 to 1945; Morro de São Paulo was largely abandoned by the federal government and suffered from both famine and lawlessness.

Education 
Morro de São Paulo is home to the Waldorf pedagogy school, Escola CreArte.

Transportation
The only way to get to the island is by boat or by flights from Salvador da Bahia airport to Morro de São Paulo Airport.

Historic sites

Morro de São Paulo is home to three historic sites: the Fonte Grande of Morro de São Paulo, the Fortaleza do Morro de São Paulo, and the Morro de São Paulo Lighthouse.

References

External links 

 
 Morro de São Paulo Infos about Morro de São Paulo
 

Populated coastal places in Bahia
1535 establishments in the Portuguese Empire
Populated places established in 1535